Sister Theresa Kugel, OP (1912, Orekhovo-Zuyevo, Moscow Oblast, Russian Empire – 1977, Vilnius, Lithuania), was a Dominican nun of the Russian Catholic Church. Her birth name was Minna Rahmielovna Kugel (Минна Рахмиэловна Кугель).

Biography
Mina Rakhmielovna Kugel was born in 1912 into the family of a rabbi. Her parents and siblings were later described as, "good and decent people, faithful to all the precepts of the Jewish religion." Mina, however, grew up feeling torn between the Orthodox Jewish values of her family and the indoctrination into Marxist–Leninist atheism through the Soviet educational system.

In 1929, a 15-year old Mina Kugel graduated from high school in Yaroslavl, and returned to her parents in Kostroma, where she became closely acquainted with two of her father's boarders, Stephanie Gorodets and Margarita Krylevskoy. Both women were nuns of the Moscow community of the Third Order of Saint Dominic which had been founded in August 1917 by Mother Catherine Abrikosova. Until this time, Mina Kugel had never before been exposed to Christianity.

In 1930, Mina was staying with her uncle in Yaroslavl and undergoing treatment for pulmonary tuberculosis. Out of curiosity, she went into a local Roman Catholic parish while Fr. Josif Josiukas was offering a Solemn High Mass followed by Eucharistic Adoration. After the Mass, Mina Kugel was looking at the Blessed Sacrament exposed in the Monstrance when she was overwhelmed by a new belief in the Real Presence and burst into tears. She left the church transformed into a completely different person.

In 1931, Mina Kugel, who now desired only to become a Catholic, travelled to Moscow and stayed with her relatives. She was secretly baptized into the Russian Greek Catholic Church, with Nora Rubashova as her godmother, by the former Symbolist poet Fr. Sergei Solovyov. Mina Kugel took the Christian name of Theresa, in honor of St. Thérèse of Lisieux.

Kugel's illness was considered hopeless and the doctors had reportedly given up on her. But after Bishop Pie Eugène Neveu gave her a flask of water from Lourdes, Kugel was cured and the doctors were allegedly unable to explain why.

In 1932 she moved to Krasnodar, where she was tonsured a nun with the name Teresa. On 6 October 1933 in Krasnodar she was arrested and taken to Moscow, where she was placed in Butyrskaya prison. On 19 February 1934 she was sentenced to 3 years in a labor camp. Kugel was released on 16 November 1935. After December she lived in Bryansk and in October 1937 moved to Maloyaroslavets. During World War II she was in the zone occupied by the Germans. After Maloyaroslavets was liberated by Red Army, Kugel was arrested on charges of collaboration with the Germans. On 31 October 1942 she was sentenced to five years in labor camps and sent to Temlag. She was released on 25 March 1947 and returned to live in Maloyaroslavets. In the autumn of next year she moved to Kaluga. On 3 April 1949 Kugel she was arrested on charges of espionage for the Vatican. On 2 July 1949 she was declared mentally insane and 17 September forcibly treated in special hospitals. On 15 October 1952, Theresa Kugel was transferred into an ordinary psychiatric hospital. 

After her release in 1953, she moved to Vilnius and became the driving force in the monastic revival of the Dominican community in a Khrushchyovka apartment building on Dzuku Street. Georgii Friedman, a jazz musician and recent Catholic convert who first visited them in 1974, found that the Sisters were being ministered to by Dominican priests visiting from the People's Republic of Poland and by Fr. Volodymyr Prokopiv, a fellow Gulag survivor and priest of the illegal and underground Ukrainian Greek Catholic Church.

Friedman later recalled, "I remember how the atmosphere of quiet and peace in their quarters delighted me. On the walls hung large images of Saint Dominic and Saint Catherine of Siena. In the tiniest little chapel they had made an altar put of a dresser, and on the altar stood a crucifix. A lamp flickered in a beautiful vessel to show that the Blessed Sacrament was reserved there."

Friedman also recalled, "Sister Teresa, sixty-two years old, was tall, stocky, and plain. Her face reflected a selfless faith. She was then still working as a nurse in the hospital."

She died during surgery in Vilnius in 1977.

Sources
I. Osipova 1996. S. 178; I. Osipova 1999. S. 333, the investigative case Abrikosov and others 1934 / / CA FSB RF, Investigative deal LB Ott and others / / TSLFSB Russia.

References

External Links
Book of Remembrance: Biographies of Catholic Clergy and Laity Repressed in the Soviet Union - Biography of Minna Kugel (Sr. Teresa of the Child Jesus, OP), University of Notre Dame

1912 births
1977 deaths
20th-century Eastern Catholic nuns
Converts to Eastern Catholicism from Judaism
Dominican nuns
Eastern Catholic Dominican nuns
Gulag detainees
 Jewish Gulag detainees
Russian Eastern Catholics
Russian Jews
Soviet Eastern Catholics